A side band or sideband can refer to:
 Side project, in music
 Sideband, in communications, either of the two bands of frequencies, one just above and one just below a carrier frequency, that result from modulation of a carrier wave